Mohammad Jafar Asadi is an Iranian senior military officer in the Islamic Revolutionary Guard Corps and the deputy commander of Khatam-al Anbiya Central Headquarter. He previously commanded IRGC Ground Forces between 2008 and 2009. Asadi is a veteran of the Iran–Iraq War and he was the commander of 33rd Al-Mahdi Division.

References 

1948 births
Living people
Islamic Revolutionary Guard Corps personnel of the Iran–Iraq War
People from Shiraz
Islamic Revolutionary Guard Corps brigadier generals
Islamic Revolutionary Guard Corps personnel of the Syrian civil war
Quds Force personnel